Mendip District Council in Somerset, England is elected every four years.

Political control

Leadership
The leaders of the council since 2007 have been:

Council elections
1973 Mendip District Council election
1976 Mendip District Council election
1979 Mendip District Council election (New ward boundaries)
1983 Mendip District Council election
1987 Mendip District Council election
1991 Mendip District Council election (District boundary changes took place but the number of seats remained the same)
1995 Mendip District Council election
1999 Mendip District Council election (New ward boundaries increased the number of seats by three)
2003 Mendip District Council election
2007 Mendip District Council election (New ward boundaries increased the number of seats by one)
2011 Mendip District Council election
2015 Mendip District Council election
2019 Mendip District Council election

District result maps

By-election results

1995–1999

1999–2003

2003–2007

2007–2011

2015–2019

2019–2023

References

Mendip election results
By-election results

External links
Mendip District Council

 
Mendip
Mendip